Cabril Dam is a concrete double curvature arch dam on the Zêzere River, where the river forms the border line between the districts of Castelo Branco and Leiria. It is located in the municipality Sertã, in Castelo Branco District, Portugal.

Construction of the dam began in 1950. The dam was completed in 1954. It is owned by Companhia Portuguesa de Produção de Electricidade (CPPE).

Dam
Cabril Dam is a 132 m tall (height above foundation) and 290 m long double curvature arch dam with a crest altitude of 297 m. The volume of the dam is 360,000 m³. The dam features on both banks one shaft spillway (combined maximum discharge 2,200 m³/s) and one bottom outlet (maximum discharge 200 m³/s).
The Dam's arch is crossed by Estrada Nacional 2, Portugal's longest road

Reservoir
At full reservoir level of 294 m (maximum flood level of 296.3 m) the reservoir of the dam has a surface area of 20.23 km2 and a total capacity of 720 mio. m³ (active capacity 615 mio. m³). Minimum operating level is 240 m. With the 615 mio. m³ water 339.3 GWh can be produced.

Power plant 
The hydroelectric power plant went operational in 1954. It is owned by CPPE, but operated by EDP. The plant has a nameplate capacity of 108 (97) MW. Its average annual generation is 304.8 (301 or 312) GWh.

The power station contains 2 Francis turbine-generators with 47 MW (61 MVA) each in a surface powerhouse at the toe of the dam. The turbine rotation is 214.3 rpm. The minimum hydraulic head is 84.6 m, the maximum 121.5 m. Maximum flow per turbine is 54 m³/s.

See also

 List of power stations in Portugal
 List of dams and reservoirs in Portugal

References

Dams in Portugal
Hydroelectric power stations in Portugal
Arch dams
Dams completed in 1954
Energy infrastructure completed in 1954
1954 establishments in Portugal
Buildings and structures in Castelo Branco District